Evelyn Tokue Kawamoto (September 17, 1933 – January 22, 2017), also known by her married name as Evelyn Konno, was an American competition swimmer and two-time Olympic medalist.

In 1949, Kawamoto broke the American record in the 300-meter individual medley (IM) and 200-meter breaststroke on the same day.  A month later, she won both events at the US Nationals.  On the final day of the 1952 U.S. Women's Olympic Trials, she set the American record in the 400-meter freestyle.

Kawamoto represented the United States at the 1952 Summer Olympics in Helsinki, where she earned two bronze medals as an 18-year-old.  She received her first bronze in the women's 4×100-meter freestyle relay, when the U.S. team of Jackie LaVine, Marilee Stepan, Jody Alderson and Kawamoto placed third behind the teams from Hungary and the Netherlands.  Individually, she set an Olympic record in the 400-meter freestyle in a preliminary heat and received a second bronze for her third-place performance in the women's 400-meter freestyle behind Hungarian swimmers Valéria Gyenge and Éva Novák.

She later married U.S. Olympic swimming gold medalist Ford Konno, who also competed at the 1952 Summer Olympics. Kawamoto was inducted into the Hawaii Sports Hall of Fame in 2000.  She died in 2017 at the age of 83.

See also
 List of Olympic medalists in swimming (women)

References

1933 births
2017 deaths
American female freestyle swimmers
American sportswomen
American sportspeople of Japanese descent
Olympic bronze medalists for the United States in swimming
Swimmers at the 1952 Summer Olympics
Medalists at the 1952 Summer Olympics
Swimmers from Honolulu
21st-century American women
Hawaii people of Japanese descent